Willy Düskow   was a German rower. He won the  bronze medal in the men's coxless pair along with Martin Stahnke in the 1908 Summer Olympics.

References

Year of birth missing
Year of death missing
Place of birth missing
German male rowers
Olympic rowers of Germany
Rowers at the 1908 Summer Olympics
Olympic bronze medalists for Germany
Olympic medalists in rowing
Medalists at the 1908 Summer Olympics